Fort Ward may refer to several former military installations in the United States including:

Fort Ward (Florida)
Fort Ward (Virginia)
Fort Ward (Washington)

Fort Ward may also refer to:
Fort Ward, Bainbridge Island, Washington, a town
Fort Ward Park, a former state park in Bainbridge Island, Washington, that came under municipal control in 2011